Patrik Edlund (born March 23, 1992) is a Swedish professional ice hockey player. He played with Timrå IK in the Elitserien during the 2010–11 Elitserien season.

References

External links

1992 births
Living people
Timrå IK players
Swedish ice hockey defencemen
People from Sundsvall
Sportspeople from Västernorrland County